Kief (from Moroccan Arabic كيف kīf, "Joy, pleasure"), sometimes transliterated as keef, also known as ‘’Dust’’ and "Chief" a.k.a cannabis crystals among other names, refers to the pure and clean collection of loose cannabis trichomes, which are accumulated by being sifted from cannabis flowers or buds with a mesh screen or sieve.  Like some other cannabis concentrates, it contains a much higher concentration of THC and other psychoactive cannabinoids than that of the cannabis flower from which it is derived. Since it contains a higher level of THC, many consumers choose to add collected kief to their cannabis for a more intense "high"; by the same token, this preparation may induce unwelcome levels of intoxication.

Traditionally, kief has been pressed into cakes of hashish for convenience in storage, although it can be vaporized or smoked in either form. After the kief is collected it is heated and pressurized, resulting in hashish.

In Morocco, kief also refers to a traditional mix of finely-chopped cannabis and indigenous tobacco, which is distinctly different from trichome powder. It is usually smoked in a long pipe called a sebsi. In other countries, such as the US and those of Western Europe, kief is used to make products via infusions. Some examples are baked cookies, brownies or other edibles. Due to its potency, however, some users consume only a small quantity of kief in order to limit its effects.

Gallery

See also 

 Hash oil
 Bhang
 Charas

References 

Cannabis culture
Cannabis in Morocco
Cannabis smoking
Preparations of cannabis